Carl Kochao Chang is Professor of Computer Science, Professor of Human Computer Interaction and Director of Software Engineering Laboratory in the Department of Computer Science at Iowa State University, where he served as its department chair from 2002 to 2013. He received a PhD in computer science from Northwestern University.

Career
He worked for GTE Automatic Electric and Bell Laboratories before joining the University of Illinois at Chicago in 1984, where he directed the International Center for Software Engineering. He served as Professor and Director for the Institute for Mobile, Pervasive, and Agile Computing Technologies (IMPACT) at Auburn University from 2001 to 2002, before moving to Iowa State University in July 2002. Chang was the 2004 IEEE Computer Society president. Previously he served as the Editor-in-Chief for IEEE Software (1991–1994) and Editor-in-Chief for IEEE Computer (2007–2010). He spearheaded the Computing Curricula 2001 (CC2001) project jointly sponsored by the IEEE Computer Society, the ACM, and the National Science Foundation. He is a Life Fellow of IEEE, a Fellow of AAAS, and a member and an officer of the European Academy of Sciences. Chang retired from Iowa State University in 2022.

Awards and recognition
He received the 2000 IEEE Third Millennium Medal, the 2006 Bulgaria Academy of Sciences Marin Drinov Medal, and the 2012 IEEE Computer Society Richard E. Merwin Medal. As a three times winner of IBM Faculty Award, Chang's research interests include software engineering, human computer interaction and digital health. He is the founder of Situation Analytics based on his Situ theoretical framework. He is the recipient of the 2014 Overseas Outstanding Contribution Award from China Computer Federation (CCF 中国计算机学会) as well as the 2014 Distinguished Alumnus by the National Central University in Taiwan (中央大學－台灣)。

References

External links 
Carl K. Chang's web site
Carl K. Chang's official web site

American computer scientists
American people of Taiwanese descent
Auburn University faculty
Fellow Members of the IEEE
Fellows of the American Association for the Advancement of Science
Iowa State University faculty
University of Illinois Chicago faculty
Living people
Northwestern University alumni
Engineers from Iowa
National Central University alumni
1952 births